Cornwallis South Reef, also known as ; Osmeña Reef; Mandarin , is a coral atoll reef in the Spratly Islands in the South China Sea. It covers an area of about 10 km by 5 km, and is entirely submerged at high tide.

Territorial claims
The reef is controlled by Vietnam, but is claimed by China as part of its claim to the entire Spratly Islands. In 2009, Vietnam, in a submission to the UN Commission on the Limits of the Continental Shelf (CLCS), accepted that its continental shelf did not include Cornwallis and therefore they have no entitlement to exploit it.

Development
The reef has been subjected to a small amount of development by Vietnam. Structures have been built at three points on the reef, in 2014/15 two access channels were dredged to allow ships enter the lagoon, and in 2015 small-scale land reclamation was started beside the new access channels. Much of the reclamation work was washed away by Typhoon Melor in December 2015.

References

External links
Maritime Transparency Initiative Island Tracker

Reefs of the Spratly Islands
Reefs of Vietnam